Cooltempo, the dance music imprint of Chrysalis Records, was revived in May 2018.  The label released albums by artists such as Kenny Thomas, Milli Vanilli, Adeva, Shara Nelson, Mica Paris and Innocence.

History
Cooltempo emerged at the end of the 1980s during the height of the UK acid house scene, signing dance acts such as Monie Love and Adeva. As the dance scene became increasingly fragmented, Cooltempo continued with soul/jazz vocalists such as Juliet Roberts, later branching out with jazz/hip hop artists Guru, Gang Starr, Brand New Heavies and Arrested Development. DJ Trevor Nelson worked with the label from 1993 and signed Lynden David Hall and D'Angelo.

Cooltempo came under the ownership of Blue Raincoat Music as part of their purchase of Chrysalis Records in June 2016.

Cooltempo's first release in nearly 20 years came from DJ and producer Francesca Lombardo with her ‘Eye Ring’ single followed by her debut album Life Of Leaf. The LP merges electronica with musical elements derived from Francesca's classical training. Cooltempo then released the debut album from electronic music mainstays Infinity Ink.

Robin Millar, Chrysalis Blue Raincoat Group Chairman  and a successful UK producer with over 160 gold, silver and platinum awards coupled with 44 Number 1 singles to his name  released a new album on Cooltempo Records in Summer 2020. The record, Meditation From A Desert Island, was initially created for his colleagues during lockdown, to offer them a new soundtrack each week to help with their mental wellbeing. The tracks were so well received that collectively a decision was made to release them officially.

Discography

Adeva: The 12" Mixes, Adeva, Love Or Lust
Afrika Bambaataa & Family: The Light
Carleen Anderson: The Remixes/The Bsides
D*Note: Lost And Found, Waiting Hopefully
David Grant & Jaki Graham: The Very Best Of
Earthling:  Radar
Eternal: The Remixes
Inner City: Praise, Fire, Paradise Remixed
Kenny Thomas: Wait For Me
Loose Ends: A Little Spice
Luciana: One More River (album), If You Want (digital download & video), Get It Up For Love (digital download & video), One More River (digital download & video)
GTO : Pure
Paul Hardcastle: Paul Hardcastle
Ruthless Rap Assassins: Killer Album
Various Artists: Cooltempo Sampler
Damage:	Ghetto Romance
Damage:	Rumours
Damage:	Still Be Lovin' You
Damage:	So What If I?
Jaki Graham: Heaven Knows
Jaki Graham: Breaking Away
Juliet Roberts:	Natural Thing
K-Klass: Remixes
Lynden David Hall: Sexy Cinderella (remixes)
Paul Hardcastle: No Winners

See also
 List of record labels
List of Cooltempo albums

References

External links

1980s establishments in the United Kingdom
British record labels
EMI